William Bonner may refer to:
 William Bonner (newscaster) (born 1963), Brazilian newscaster, publicist and journalist
 William Nigel Bonner (1928–1994), British zoologist
 William Ray Bonner (born 1948), perpetrator of a shooting spree in Los Angeles, California, 1973
 Bill Bonner (author) (born 1948), American author of books and articles on economic and financial subjects
 Bill Bonner (politician) (active since 1997), Canadian politician for the Alberta Liberal Party

See also
William Bonner McCarty, founder of Jitney Jungle